Samsaram is a 1950 Indian Telugu-language drama film directed by L. V. Prasad. It stars N. T. Rama Rao, Akkineni Nageswara Rao and Lakshmirajyam, with music composed by  Susarla Dakshinamurthi. It was produced by K. V. Krishna and C. V. Ranganatha Rao under the Sadhana Productions banner. The film was recorded as a Blockbuster at the box office. The film was later remade in Tamil with the same name, in Hindi as Sansar and in Malayalam as Ayodhya (1975).

Plot
Raghu (N. T. Rama Rao) is a government clerk who lives happily with his wife Manjula (Laxmirajyam) and two children. Raghu's mother Venkamma (Bezwada Kanthamma), sister Kamakshi (Surabhi Balasaraswathi), and her husband Tata Rao (Relangi) depend on him. Very soft-natured Manjula suffers in the hands of shrewd Venkamma. Venu (Akkineni Nageswara Rao), the younger brother of Raghu stays back in the village. He is an honest, straightforward gentleman. Once Venu gets acquainted with a beautiful Kamala (Pushpalata), who has to stay in his house for a night because her car is being repaired.

Kamala's father Sundara Rao (Dr. Damodaram) is a rich man in Vijayawada. She invites Venu to come to her house. Venu, when he goes to Vijayawada, observes how his sister-in-law is being harassed by his mother and sister. Venu and Kamala start loving each other. Venu gets a job with the help of her father.

On the other hand, Raghu is struggling hard to maintain the house. Moreover, Manjula joins for delivery in the hospital. Venu sends money after selling the property but Venkamma doesn't give that to Raghu. Raghu sells Manjula's wedding chain which also is snatched by Venkamma. Raghu loses his job and in frustration, he leaves the house. Venkamma and Kamakshi blame Manjula. Kamala informs Venu then he forcibly takes money from his mother and clears the debts. Venkamma tells Kamala that there is an affair between Venu and Manjula, which Kamala believes.

Manjula also leaves the house with the children writing a letter that Venu is like her brother, then Kamala realizes and asks for pardon from Venu. Manjula reaches Coimbatore. Sundara Rao asks Venu to marry Kamala, but he says he will marry only after getting back his brother and sister-in-law. Raghu also reaches to Coimbatore.

Meanwhile, Venu meets Thatha Rao, his sister's husband, and tells him that the only way to change his wife is through harsh behavior. Thatha Rao whips Kamakshi and Venkamma and makes them silent. Meanwhile, Sundara Rao purchases a mill at Coimbatore, and Venu and Kamala also shift there. The mill manager Ramesh (Nalla Ram Murthy) has an evil eye on Kamala. Manjula sends her elder son Gopi (Master Anand) to work in the mill.

Once Gopi meets Raghu, who is almost mad. Gopi forces him to work in the mill. Raghu becomes sick and Gopi brings him home when Manjula recognizes Raghu. Manjula goes to Sundara Rao to ask for some amount for Raghu's medicines; when he refuses, she beats him and steals money. At the same time, Kamala and Ramesh reach there, where they see Venu and suspect him. Ramesh calls for the police and Venu gets arrested. The rest of the story is about how Venu proves his innocence, finds his brother and family, and reunites with them.

Cast
 Nandamuri Taraka Rama Rao as Raghu
 Akkineni Nageshwara Rao as Venu
 Lakshmirajyam as Manjula
 Relangi as Tataram
 Doraiswamy as Doctor
 Dr. Damodaram as Sundara Rao
 Nalla Ram Murthy as Manager Ramesh
 Suryakantham as Seshamma
 Pushpalata as Kamala
 Surabhi Balasaraswati as Kamakshi
 Bezawada Kanthamma as Venkamma
 Master Anand as Gopi
 Baby Aruna

Music 

Music was composed by Susarla Dakshinamurthi. The song Samsaram Samsaram is a memorable melody song. Music released on SAREGAMA Audio Company. The title song "Samsaram Samsaram" is inspired from the song "Yeh Zindagi Ke Mele" from the 1948 film Mela, sung by Mohammed Rafi.

Box office
The film ran for more than 100 days in 11 centers, celebrated a Silver Jubilee and ran for 224 days in Madras.

References

External links
 
 Samsaram review at Roopavani

1950 films
1950s Telugu-language films
Indian black-and-white films
1950s Tamil-language films
Films directed by L. V. Prasad
Films scored by Susarla Dakshinamurthi
Telugu films remade in other languages
Indian drama films
1950 drama films